Seynesiella is a genus of fungi in the Microthyriaceae family.

The genus was circumscribed by Gabriel Arnaud in Ann. École Natl. Agric. Montpellier ser.2, vol.16 on pages 202-203 in
1918.

The genus name of Seynesiella is in honour of Jules de Seynes (1833–1912), who was a French physician, botanist and mycologist, and Professor of Natural history at the Medical faculty within the University of Paris. He previously also was at the University of Montpellier.

Species
As accepted by Species Fungorum;
Seynesiella exigua 
Seynesiella juniperi 
Seynesiella melaleucae 
Seynesiella sequoiae 
Seynesiella syzygii

References

External links
Index Fungorum

Microthyriales